Borrow or borrowing can mean: to receive (something) from somebody temporarily, expecting to return it.
In finance, monetary debt
In language, the use of loanwords
In arithmetic, when a digit becomes less than zero and the deficiency is taken from the next digit to the left
In music, the use of borrowed chords
In construction, borrow pit
In golf, the tendency of a putted ball to deviate from the straight line; see Glossary of golf#B

People
 David Borrow (born 1952), British politician
 George Borrow (1803–1881), English author
 Nik Borrow, bird artist and ornithologist

See also
 Borough
 Borro (disambiguation)
 Borrowes, a surname
 Borrows, a surname
 Bureau (disambiguation)
 Burrow